The Federal University of Roraima (UFRR) is a Brazilian public institution which is located in Boa Vista, Brazil.

References

External links

 

Roraima
Boa Vista, Roraima
Buildings and structures in Roraima
Educational institutions established in 1989
1989 establishments in Brazil